Moroto Airport  is an airport serving Moroto in the Northern Region of Uganda. It is one of twelve upcountry airports managed by the Civil Aviation Authority of Uganda.

See also
 Transport in Uganda
 
 
 List of airports in Uganda

References

External links
 HERE/Nokia - Moroto
 SkyVector - Moroto National

Airports in Uganda
Moroto District